Caloptilia sapina is a moth of the family Gracillariidae. It is known from Namibia and South Africa.

The larvae feed on Sapium ellipticum. They mine the leaves of their host plant. The mine has the form of a very irregular, semi-transparent or transparent blotch-mine.

References

sapina
Moths of Africa
Insects of Namibia